The 2019 Campeonato da Primeira Divisão de Futebol Profissional da FGF (2019 FGF First Division Professional Football Championship), better known as the 2019 Campeonato Gaúcho or  Gaúcho, was the 99th edition of the top flight football league of the Brazilian state of Rio Grande do Sul. The season began on 20 January and ended on 21 April. 

The 12 clubs contested in the Campeonato Gaúcho (Championship A1 Series) in a first phase single round-robin and two-legged knockout bracket in the final. Grêmio successfully defended in the final its 36th championship title to add the 2019 championship to its cache over Taça Centenário champions Brasil de Pelotas. VAR use would debut in the tournament's history for both legs of the final and any Grenal matches that take place.

Format
The Gauchão was contested between 12 teams in the first phase a single round-robin, who first played in a single round-robin. The 8 top ranked teams qualified for the final stage, a two-legged knockout bracket, and the 2 bottom ranked teams were relegated to the Série A2. Three places were available in the 2020 Copa do Brasil, while either one or two places would be available in the 2020 Série D, depending on the decision of the CBF to reduce the number of participant clubs from 68 to 40. A new distinction called the Campeonato do Interior Gaúcho, was awarded to the best-placing team outside the final. Grêmio and Internacional are automatically eliminated from being eligible for the award.

Participating teams

First phase

Final phase

Bracket

Final

General table

Goals

References

Campeonato Gaúcho seasons